Ever since the introduction of the Nintendo DS in 2004, which is Nintendo's first gaming console to have wireless communication as a standard, Nintendo has introduced a variety of instant messaging applications to suit each gaming console they have released ever since. The following is a list of the messaging applications which were developed for Nintendo's consoles.

PictoChat

 is a communication utility that comes pre-installed on the Nintendo DS, Nintendo DS Lite and Nintendo DSi consoles. Up to sixteen people can paint and/or text chat with each other using it, connected wirelessly through a LAN-only, system-to-system wireless connection. It allows for simple input of keyboard text and written text/drawings. PictoChat received an Excellence Prize for Entertainment at the 2004 Japan Media Arts Festival.

Functions 

The Nintendo DS touch screen is used to type in letters with an on-screen keyboard or to draw and send pictures. Text can also be manually placed on the screen, if the user drags the selected character onto the message area. Messages sent from the DS or DS Lite appear in black, while DSi systems feature an additional "rainbow" pen. The pen tool offers small and large sizes. The keyboard provides enough Latin and kana glyphs to write in all languages supported by the system: English, German, French, Spanish, Italian, and Japanese, plus Hungarian, Finnish, Portuguese and Dutch.

PictoChat displays the name and message managed in System Settings to all the users in the same chat room.

Four chat rooms (A, B, C & D) are available at one time, each with a capacity of sixteen people, for a maximum of sixty-four people in total of all the chat rooms.

PictoChat is preloaded onto all Nintendo DS, Nintendo DS Lite, Nintendo DSi, and Nintendo DSi XL units worldwide.

On the DSi versions of PictoChat, a rainbow pen can be used by tapping on the pen icon again once it has been selected. Content created using the rainbow pen can be read by PictoChat users on Nintendo DS Lite and original Nintendo DS systems. Additionally, the DS and DS Lite play a special sound when receiving a message written by a DSi user. The console plays a special sound and displays a special message when a user joins on their birthday.

Super Smash Bros. appearances
A stage based on PictoChat appears in Super Smash Bros. Brawl. Another stage called "PictoChat 2" appears in Super Smash Bros. for Nintendo 3DS, and is exclusive to the portable variant. An HD version of "PictoChat 2" returns in Super Smash Bros. Ultimate.

PictoChat animation 
Not an official function, but still mentioned in the manual, is the use of PictoChat to create short animations by drawing individual pictures on the Nintendo DS's touch screen and sending them frame by frame to the message board on the top screen. By pressing and holding down the left shoulder button and right shoulder button respectively to scroll through the pictures, it shows them at a frame rate of 7.5 frames per second, creating the illusion of animation. Several online galleries are dedicated to sharing PictoChat animations.

The Nintendo DS kanji-English-Japanese dictionary  contains an extension to PictoChat that allows users to input kanji characters in addition to the standard character set. This version of PictoChat also vocalized roman characters and kana when they are input. This software is only available in Japan and is the only type of PictoChat that can be used on Nintendo 3DS consoles without modification.

Wii Message Board 

The Wii Message Board allows users to leave messages for friends, family members, or other users on a calendar-based message board. Users could also use WiiConnect24 to trade messages and pictures with other Wii owners, conventional email accounts (email pictures to console, but not pictures to email), and mobile phones (through text messages). Each Wii has an individual wii.com email account containing the Wii Number. Prior to trading messages it is necessary to add and approve contacts in the address book, although the person added will not get an automatic notification of the request, and must be notified by other means. The service also alerts all users of incoming game-related information.

The Wii Message Board was available for users to post messages that are available to other Wii users by usage of Wii Numbers with WiiConnect24.  In addition to writing text, players could also include images from an SD card in the body of messages, as well as attaching a Mii to the message. Announcements of software updates and video game news was posted by Nintendo. The Message Board can be used for posting memos for oneself or for family members without going online. These messages could then be put on any day of the calendar. The Wii Message Board could also be updated automatically by a real-time game like Animal Crossing: City Folk.

Wii Sports, Wii Play, Mario Kart Wii, Wii Speak Channel, Wii Sports Resort, Super Mario Galaxy & Super Mario Galaxy 2  use the Message Board to update the player on any new high scores or gameplay advancements, such as medal placements in the former two titles, completions of races including a photo, audio messages, and letters from the Mailtoad via the Wii message board. Metroid Prime 3: Corruption, Super Mario Galaxy, Super Smash Bros Brawl, Elebits, Animal Crossing: City Folk, Dewy's Adventure, Calling and the Virtual Console game Pokémon Snap allow players to take screenshots and post them to the Message Board to edit later or send to friends via messages. Calling also sends the player death pictures and letters that can be triggered by certain events. Except for Nintendo GameCube games, the Message Board also records the play history in the form of "Today's Accomplishments". This feature automatically records details of what games or applications were played and for how long. It cannot be deleted or hidden without formatting the console itself.

Subsequent system updates added a number of minor features to the Message Board, including minor aesthetic changes, USB keyboard support and the ability to receive Internet links from friends, which can be launched in the Internet Channel.

The Wii Message Board is partially supported on Wii U via Wii Mode. Players can still receive internal messages from various Wii games that support this feature. Since the Wii U neither supports WiiConnect24, nor has its own Wii Friend Code, it cannot receive messages from or send messages to other sources or players. Consequently, the Wii U's Wii Message Board lacks an Address Book. Additionally, the WiiConnect24 service has no longer available as of June 28, 2013, completely ceasing data exchange functionality of the Wii Message Board for all Wii consoles themselves, whether as messages or game data.

The Wii Message Board is partially succeeded by the Notifications app on both Nintendo 3DS and Wii U, albeit the app does not support sending messages. It is also partially succeeded by the Activity Log app on the same consoles in terms of recording and saving historic data based on the user's activity and game play.

Wii Speak Channel 

Wii Speak is a microphone accessory for the Wii. Connected to the console via USB, the device can be placed near the video display, allowing voice chat to be conducted with the entire room and as it is placed on top of the sensor bar. In 2008, Nintendo launched the Wii Speak Channel, which allows users to chat in one of four rooms with Wii Friends using Wii Speak online. The Wii Speak Channel ceased functionality after May 20, 2014 since the free Nintendo Wi-Fi Connection service was discontinued.

Swapnote/Nintendo Letter Box

Swapnote, known as Nintendo Letter Box in PAL regions and Suddenly Exchange Diary in Japan, is a messaging application for the Nintendo 3DS family. The software was launched in the Nintendo eShop in 2011. Swapnote allows users to send hand-written/drawn messages to either registered friends online via SpotPass or other users locally via StreetPass. Nintendo suspended Swapnotes SpotPass functionality in 2013.

Swapdoodle

On November 17, 2016, without any prior announcements, Nintendo released a Nintendo 3DS app, via Nintendo eShop in North America, Europe, and Australia, called Swapdoodle, a spiritual successor to 2011's Swapnote/Nintendo Letter Box. It was released in Japan on November 22, 2016, under the name .

Swapdoodle is largely similar to Swapnote/Nintendo Letter Box in many aspects, including the latter's discontinued online ability to share stereoscopic 3D handwritten or drawn messages with anyone listed on the Nintendo 3DS friends list, as well as receive special messages from Nintendo. Swapdoodle also features an online store where users can download mostly paid DLC, which include additional pen effects, message space, stationery, and simple drawing lessons of various Nintendo characters. The app itself is free to download.

Unlike Swapnote/Nintendo Letter Box, Swapdoodle only allows the exchange of native in-game screenshots, but not generic picture and audio files. Additionally, Swapdoodle does not support StreetPass or any ability for wireless LAN exchange of messages.

Wii U Chat 

 was Wii U's online chat solution, powered by the Nintendo Network. The service allowed users to use the Wii U GamePad's front-facing camera to video chat with registered friends. While video chatting, only the Wii U GamePad is needed, since on the TV, the same picture as in the GamePad's is shown. Users could have also drawn on the GamePad during a chat session.

If there is a game or another application already running, the Wii U GamePad's HOME button ring will flash indicating that there is an incoming call. The idea of the feature was originally seen in the introduction trailer of the Wii U in E3 2011. However, users won't also be able to use the service as a multitasking application, therefore not having the ability to make video calls without interrupting game play.

Wii U Chat arrived in a "day one" update on the same day the Wii U launched. On August 29, 2017, Nintendo announced the worldwide discontinuation of the Wii U Chat service on November 7, 2017, at 10:00 pm JST, the same date Miiverse was discontinued.

Similar software 
The Nintendo DS game Ping Pals is based on PictoChat, featuring an advanced range of options and capabilities. 
However, both users must own the game, making it less useful and widespread than PictoChat.  Due to PictoChat being built into the system, Ping Pals received very negative reviews.

Clubhouse Games (42-All Time Classics in Europe) has a chat function similar to PictoChat, with added colors and extra features.

The game LOL has a similar interface to PictoChat but the gameplay itself is different.

The app features many attributes from both PictoChat and Swapnote. It was developed by Japan-based WaiS Co. Ltd. and published by The Location Inc. in Japan and Teyon in North America and Europe, and costs ¥1000/$7.99/€7.99/£7.19 to download. Despite its features and use of emojis, the app was poorly received due to consistent lag time for a paid app. Chat-A-Lot was delisted off the Nintendo eShop in Japan on December 1, 2019, under authority of its developer, and has been subsequently delisted in North America and Europe, and the online service was discontinued worldwide on February 29, 2020.

Animal Crossing titles since Wild World has featured some form of online messaging service. For example, in either New Leaf or New Horizons, if two players are online at the same time and are registered as best friends within each other's system, they can send messages to each other, even if they are not in the same town/island.

Some titles released for the Nintendo DS also included some PictoChat integration. For example, True Swing Golf's User Manual describes on page 27 (US release) that the interface featured a PictoChat Search button that allows players to see if anyone around them is using PictoChat. Curiously, the game also has its own messaging feature that allowed handwritten messages to be sent to other DS systems.

References

Nintendo
Nintendo DS software
Nintendo 3DS
Wii
Wii U
Nintendo Network
21st century-related lists